They Do It with Mirrors is a detective fiction novel by British writer Agatha Christie, first published in the US by Dodd, Mead and Company in 1952 under the title of Murder with Mirrors and in UK by the Collins Crime Club on 17 November that year under Christie's original title. The US edition retailed at $2.50 and the UK edition at ten shillings and sixpence (10/6). The book features her detective Miss Marple.

One review at the time of publication praised the essence of the plot but felt the latter half of the novel moved too slowly. A later review considered that this novel showed "Definite signs of decline" and felt the author was not entirely comfortable with the setting she described in the novel.

Synopsis
While visiting her American school friend Ruth Van Rydock in London, Miss Marple learns that Ruth is seriously concerned for her sister Carrie Louise. She asks Miss Marple to visit Carrie Louise at Stonygates, her home in England. Miss Marple agrees to the visit. She is impressed by the size of the Victorian mansion, which now has a separate building for delinquent boys, the cause which engages Carrie Louise and her third husband, Lewis Serrocold. Carrie Louise has her family living with her, as her granddaughter Gina has brought her American husband Walter to England to meet her family. Daughter Mildred Strete moved back home after she was widowed. Stepsons Stephen and Alexis Restarick, now grown, are frequent visitors and are present during Miss Marple's visit. One of the first people Miss Marple encounters is Edgar Lawson, a young man acting as a secretary to Serrocold; Lawson shows clear signs of paranoid schizophrenia, but these are largely ignored.

Miss Marple learns that Carrie Louise has experienced health problems incidental to old age. Nevertheless, Miss Marple is pleased to see that Carrie Louise is still the sweet, idealistic, and loving person she has known.

An unexpected visitor arrives at Stonygates—Christian Gulbrandsen, Carrie Louise's stepson from her first marriage and a trustee of the charitable foundation that his father set up with the wealth he generated in his life. Lewis Serrocold walks from the train station and meets Christian on the terrace. Miss Marple watches them through her bird-watcher's binoculars and tries to learn the reason for Christian's unexpected visit. She hears a few phrases concerning the importance of keeping a problem from Carrie Louise, and that the two men agree to call for outside help. Both men enter for dinner, and afterwards, Christian retires to his room to write letters.

The rest of the household is held entranced by hearing a scene that plays out behind the locked door of Lewis Serrocold's office. Lawson enters it with a gun and speaks loudly to Lewis, claiming Lewis is his father and has treated him badly. Lawson threatens to shoot him, while Lewis tries to calm the young man.

Tension is added to the scene because an electrical problem has caused most of the Great Hall outside Lewis's office to go dark. Walter knows how to fix the overloaded fuse, so he leaves the room to fix it and then rejoins the group. While Edgar Lawson is ranting to Lewis, the family hear shots and intervene by trying to open the door. Another shot (not fired in Lewis's office) had been heard by some, but not all. When the door to Lewis's office is finally opened, Lewis scoffs at any concern for himself, and they see that the shots Lawson fired had hit the wall. Lawson collapses in tears and apologies.

Meanwhile, "Jolly" Juliet Bellever, housekeeper and companion to Carrie Louise, had gone out to find the key to the office. She returns to the room and says she has called the police, not because of the scene between Edgar Lawson and Lewis Serrocold, but because she has found Christian Gulbrandsen dead in his room from a gunshot.

Lewis proceeds to Christian's room, followed by Carrie Louise and Miss Marple. Alexis Restarick arrives at the house. His brother Stephen was already there, playing the piano after dinner. Then the police arrive.

Inspector Curry quickly establishes that none of the people from the facility for delinquent boys are involved, nor any of the servants either. Curry discovers that there was a sheet of paper in the typewriter when Jolly entered the dead man's room. Lewis admits to removing it, explaining that he had feared his wife would read it and discover that the reason for Christian's visit was his fear that someone had been poisoning Carrie Louise. Lewis suggests that the poison is in her medicine, a liquid which is shown to contain arsenic.

Miss Marple comments that most of the family would be pleased if Walter were found to be the killer, but Christian was not killed by Walter's gun, which was in Lawson's hand during the interval. Police find the murder weapon under some music inside the piano bench.

Alexis explains that his drive to the house was slowed by the fog, and that what he saw and heard in the fog, such as a shot and the sound of someone running, gave him an idea for a stage set. Alexis envisions the house as a stage, which causes Miss Marple to begin thinking differently about the murder. The next evening, Alexis and the boy Ernie Gregg are killed by stage weights.

Miss Marple explains to the police how one person could run from Lewis's study to Christian's room along the terrace in under two minutes—Lewis Serrocold. Lawson spoke as both himself and Lewis, while Lewis killed Christian and returned out of breath. The suspicion of Carrie Louise's poisoning was a ruse created by Lewis. The real reason for Christian Gulbrandsen's visit was that he had learned that Lewis was embezzling from the Gulbrandsen Trust. The reader also learns that Edgar Lawson was only pretending to be schizophrenic; in reality, he is the illegitimate son of Lewis.

When confronted by the police, Lawson flees the house, jumping into an old boat to cross a lake on the property. The boat begins to sink, so Lewis Serrocold jumps into the lake to rescue his son. Both are caught in the reeds lining the lake and drown before the police can reach them. The scene of these deaths ends with Carrie Louise walking indoors with her daughter Mildred, as a new solidarity between mother and daughter is manifest. Carrie Louise's granddaughter Gina agrees to head back to America with her American husband Walter, averting a threatened separation.

Characters
Miss Marple: an old woman with detective skills.
Ruth Van Rydock: old school friend of Miss Marple, an American socialite.
Carrie Louise Serrocold: Ruth's younger sister, also a school friend of Miss Marple.
Lewis Serrocold: Carrie Louise's third husband, once an accountant and now an enthusiast for the charitable treatment of juvenile delinquents.
Gina Hudd: granddaughter of Carrie Louise from her first marriage. She was born in Italy, moved to England as an infant when her mother died in childbirth. She spent World War II in the US with her aunt Ruth, sent there for safety. Her mother was Pippa, the adopted daughter of Carrie Louise and her first husband, Eric Gulbrandsen.
Walter Hudd: American husband of Gina.
Mildred Strete: Pippa's sister and the only child born to Carrie Louise and her first husband, Mr Gulbrandsen. She was widowed a few years before the story begins.
Juliet Bellever: called Jolly, she is Carrie Louise's secretary and companion since Louise's second marriage.
Stephen Restarick: son of Carrie Louise's second husband, who has since childhood considered Carrie Louise as a mother and her home as his home, as his father died not long after divorcing Carrie Louise. He loves Gina, and works in the theatre, helping often with the delinquents to stage plays there.
Alexis Restarick: Steven's older brother who views Carrie Louise affectionately, as his brother does. He loves Gina and also works in the theatre. He is killed at the same time as Ernie, in the theatre.
Christian Gulbrandsen: son of Carrie Louise's first husband, and half brother to Mildred. He is on the board of the Gulbrandsen family trust, periodically visiting at the house for meetings of the board. He is the first murder victim.
Edgar Lawson: one of the delinquents, arrived about a month before the story begins (after the last meeting of the board for the Gulbrandsen trust), who is often in the house and on the grounds, and who works closely with Lewis Serrocold.
Dr Maverick: chief psychiatrist for the juvenile delinquents programme; he views all people as "mental cases".
Ernie Gregg: one of the delinquents who is active in the theatre work, and is killed for boasting to Gina about what he says he saw the night of the murder. He likely made it up.
Inspector Curry: leads the police investigation of the first murder, and learns from his superiors of Miss Marple's reputation in solving crimes.
Detective Sergeant Lake: assists Curry in the investigation at Stonygates.

Title
In the text, Miss Marple says "they do it with mirrors": this is the slang term for the illusions of magicians and of a stage set. It is thinking of that which leads her to looking a new way at the evening of the first murder.

Literary significance and reception
Maurice Richardson of The Observer of 30 November 1952 summed up thus: "First half is lively and the trick alibi for the murder of the stepson neat enough; there is a marked decline in sprightliness later on, but half a shot is better than no dope."

Robert Barnard said of this novel that its setting was: "Unusual (and not entirely convincing) setting of delinquent's home, full of untrustworthy adolescents and untrustworthy do-gooders. Christie not entirely at home, perhaps because she believes (in Miss Marple's words) that 'young people with a good heredity, and brought up wisely in a good home…they are really…the sort of people a country needs.' Otherwise highly traditional, with houseplans, Marsh-y inquisitions, and second and third murders done most perfunctorily." He summed it up as showing "Definite signs of decline."

Publication history

 1952, Dodd Mead and Company (New York), 1952, Hardback, 187 pp
 1952, Collins Crime Club (London), 17 November 1952, Hardback, 192 pp
 1954, Pocket Books (New York), Paperback, 165 pp
 1956, Fontana Books (Imprint of HarperCollins), Paperback, 187 pp
 1966, Ulverscroft Large-print Edition, Hardcover, 224 pp
 1969, Greenway edition of collected works (William Collins), Hardcover, 223 pp
 1970, Greenway edition of collected works (Dodd Mead), Hardcover, 223 pp
 1974, Pan Books, Paperback, 187 pp
 2005, Marple Facsimile edition (Facsimile of 1952 UK first edition), 7 November 2005, Hardcover, 

A condensed version of the novel was first published in the US in Cosmopolitan magazine in the issue for April 1952 (Volume 132, Number 4) under the title Murder With Mirrors with illustrations by Joe Bowler. In the UK the novel was first serialised in the weekly magazine John Bull in six abridged instalments from 26 April (Volume 91, Number 2391) to 31 May 1952 (Volume 91, Number 2396) with illustrations by George Ditton.

Film, TV or theatrical adaptations
Several adaptations were made of the book for TV and Film.

Some elements of the story were incorporated into the 1964 film Murder Ahoy!, which starred Margaret Rutherford as Miss Marple, along with a token tribute to The Mousetrap. Instead of a sprawling Victorian estate, the delinquent boys are housed on board a retired ship called the Battledore, and they go ashore periodically to commit mischief under the direction of their criminal mastermind. However, the film's plot and characters are otherwise original, so much so that They Do It With Mirrors is not credited as the film's inspiration.

The novel's first proper adaptation was the 1985 television film Murder with Mirrors with Sir John Mills as Lewis Serrocold, Bette Davis as Carrie Louise, Tim Roth as Edgar Lawson and Helen Hayes as Miss Marple.

A second adaptation was aired on 29 December 1991 in the BBC series Miss Marple starring Joan Hickson as Miss Marple, Jean Simmons as Carrie-Louise Serrocold, Joss Ackland as Lewis Serrocold and Faith Brook as Ruth van Rydock. The film was basically faithful to the novel, with the exception that Alexis survives the attack on his life. Also, Ruth van Rydock is present at the house when the first murder takes place and Lawson attempts to swim across the lake, and does not use a rotted boat.

A third adaptation was aired on 1 January 2010 for the fourth season of the ITV series Agatha Christie's Marple, starring Julia McKenzie as Miss Marple, Penelope Wilton as Carrie Louise, Brian Cox as Lewis Serrocold, and Joan Collins as Ruth Van Rydock.  This adaptation has several notable changes and additions:
 Alexis Restarick is replaced by Johnny Restarick, Steven's father and Carrie Louise's ex-husband. Rather than arriving after the murder, Johnny arrives near the end of the confrontation between Lawson and Lewis and disarms Lawson, just before Mr Gulbrandsen's murder is revealed.
 While Edgar Lawson's character and role in the murders remains unchanged, his death was changed slightly in two ways - firstly, he is exposed for his involvement in the murders by Miss Marple, rather than confronted by the police, and secondly, he does not use a rotted boat to escape, but swims over the lake on the property. Lewis' efforts to rescue him remain unchanged.
 Pippa is deleted and Gina becomes Carrie Louise's adopted daughter in this version, rather than her adopted granddaughter.
 Gina's real mother was changed to Katherine Ellsworth, and her death was explained to have been from a hanging, after she was found guilty of committing arsenic poisoning on three counts. Gina discovers this fact and exposes her connection to it, moments before Alexis' death, and how she found it out is revealed, by Miss Marple's investigations, to be the fault of Mildred, who had resented her being given more attention than her.
 While the confrontation scene between Lawson and Lewis still was basis for the first murder and retained certain elements from the original plot, it was modified considerably for the adaptation:
 Everyone, bar Mr Gulbrandsen, goes to the study to witness a dress rehearsal, not to the Great Hall, and so witness in person the confrontation between the two men.
 Lawson's reason for confronting Lewis is changed; he accuses Lewis of spying on him, rather than being his real father.
 Wally is made the initial suspect in the murder, owing to his absence to fix the fuses and the murder weapon being his. The police only begin to look elsewhere, and later to Johnny, when Gina reveals the study has a secret passage that links it to the hallway; Miss Marple explains in her denouement that the passage was merely a red herring, before explaining Lewis' crimes.
 Mr Gulbrandsen is stabbed in the back instead of shot.
 A new character was introduced - Whitstable Ernest, a young man serving time for fraud and embezzlement. Ernest helped Lewis with his financial corruption in exchange for rewards such as oysters and alcohol. When Lewis knew that Mr Gulbrandsen was going to expose him, Ernest torched all the records of his actions, which Miss Marple suspected when she smelt petroleum in the secret passage. When Johnny began to question Ernest, Lewis realised the danger he could create and so gave him oysters laced with arsenic; this did not kill him, but merely kept him out of harm's way. This adaptation had two murders, not three.

There is a French television production aired in 2013, as part of the television series Les Petits Meurtres d'Agatha Christie (season two, episode one). The episode is titled "Jeux de glaces", which can mean "Game of Mirrors".

References

External links
They Do It With Mirrors at the official Agatha Christie website
They Do It with Mirrors at the Home of Agatha Christie website

1952 British novels
British novels adapted into films
Dodd, Mead & Co. books
Miss Marple novels
British novels adapted into television shows
Novels first published in serial form
Works originally published in Cosmopolitan (magazine)